Zabihullah K. Karimullah  (in Pashto ذبیح الله کلیم کریم الله;) born in 1982, an Afghan Lawyer, Human Rights Professional, is the Attorney General of Afghanistan since April 2021. He was appointed by President Ashraf Ghani after Mohammad Farid Hamidi resigned from the post. He is an ethnic Pashtun born in Logar, Afghanistan.

Early life and education

Zabihullah Karimullah was born in 1982 in Logar province in South of Afghanistan. He completed his primary education in a local school. Afterwards he was admitted to the Law School at Al-Azhar University in Cairo, Egypt, where he received his bachelor, LL.B Degree. After that, he earned his master's degree LL.M from faculty of Law of California University, UC Davis.

Career

H.E Zabihullah  K. Karimullah has more than 14 years of working experience in the areas of good governance, rule of law, access to justice and human rights at the national and international levels in Afghanistan and in Sudan with the United Nations Development Programme.

He joined the Afghan government  in 2018 and worked at the leadership level as the Attorney General of the Country and also as  the General Director of the State Lawsuits Department from 2018 till 2021.

Mr. KARIMULLAH visited the International Criminal Court in May, 2021 and met with the ICC Prosecutor Fatou Bensouda  and promised to closely work, cooperate and share information with the ICC to support the investigation of war crimes committed in Afghanistan.

Attorney General

H.E Zabihullah K. Karimullah was appointed in April, 2021 as the Attorney General of Afghanistan by President Ashraf Ghani. Karimullah served his country by strengthening the rule of law and accountability for human rights violations. He also focused on civic values and fighting against corruption, inequality, injustice, and violence against women and children in Afghanistan.

References 

1982 births
Living people
Attorneys General of Afghanistan
People from Logar Province
Pashtun people
Al-Azhar University alumni
UC Davis School of Law alumni